Askøyfjellet or Kolbeinsvarden is a mountain in the municipality of Askøy in Vestland county, Norway. The mountain is traditionally considered to be one of De syv fjell (the seven mountains) surrounding the city of Bergen.

See also
List of mountains of Norway

References

Mountains of Vestland
Askøy